Road Runner is a racing video game based on the Wile E. Coyote and Road Runner shorts. It was released in arcades by Atari Games in 1985.

Gameplay

The player controls Road Runner, who is chased by Wile E. Coyote. In order to escape, Road Runner runs endlessly to the left. While avoiding Wile E. Coyote, the player must pick up bird seeds on the street, avoid obstacles like cars, and get through mazes. Sometimes Wile E. Coyote will just run after the Road Runner, but he occasionally uses tools like rockets, roller skates, and pogo-sticks.

Development
Originally, the game was going to use laserdisc technology for the backgrounds and road. When the player died in the game, one of many cartoon death sequences taken from the original shorts would have shown. 
The game was going to be released in 1984, but Atari decided to cancel the game. The game was eventually released in 1985, but this version was a modified version. The laserdisc cutscenes were taken out of the final game, and the road and backgrounds were changed to computer-generated graphics. The prototype cabinet was eventually found, and it is now playable at California Extreme.

Music
The background music during attract mode and 4th level is "Sabre Dance" from Gayane by Aram Khachaturian, the 1st level music is "William Tell Overture" by Gioachino Rossini, 2nd level music is "Flight of the Bumblebee" by Nikolai Rimsky-Korsakov, and 3rd level is "Trepak" from The Nutcracker by Pyotr Ilyich Tchaikovsky.

Ports

Road Runner was ported to the Amstrad CPC, Atari 2600, Atari ST, Commodore 64, MS-DOS, ZX Spectrum, and Nintendo Entertainment System. The Atari 2600 port was one of Atari Corporation's last games for the system, being released in 1989.

Like other NES games released by Tengen, Road Runner was unlicensed by Nintendo itself, released as an unlicensed cartridge rounding Nintendo's protections. It was planning on to be released in a licensed version by Mindscape, but it was scrapped in the fall of 1989.

Reception
The game was reviewed in 1988 in Dragon #140 by Hartley, Patricia, and Kirk Lesser in "The Role of Computers" column. The reviewers gave the game 3 out of 5 stars.
The game went to number 2 in the UK sales charts, behind Exolon.

Reviews
Computer and Video Games (CVG) (Sep, 1987)
Computer and Video Games (CVG) (Oct, 1987)
Commodore User (Feb, 1987)
Génération 4 (1987)
ACE (Advanced Computer Entertainment) (Nov, 1989)
Zzap! (Sep, 1987)
ASM (Aktueller Software Markt) (Sep, 1987)
Happy Computer (1986)
Happy Computer (Jul, 1987)
Commodore User (Aug, 1987)
Commodore Force (Aug, 1993)

References

External links

Road Runner at the Arcade History database
Road Runner at the Arcade Flyer Archive
Road Runner for the Atari ST at Atari Mania

1985 video games
Amstrad CPC games
Arcade video games
Atari 2600 games
Atari arcade games
Atari ST games
Cancelled Game Boy Color games
Commodore 64 games
DOS games
Video games based on Looney Tunes
Tengen (company) games
Unauthorized video games
ZX Spectrum games
Wile E. Coyote and the Road Runner
Video games about birds
Video games developed in the United States
Video games scored by Fred Gray
Multiplayer and single-player video games